Macho Ritti (possibly from Quechua machu old, old person, rit'i snow, "old snow (mountain)") is a mountain in the Vilcanota mountain range in the Andes of Peru, about  high. It is located in the Puno Region, Carabaya Province, on the border of the districts Corani and Ollachea. Macho Ritti lies north-west of the lakes Mancacocha and Jomercocha and north of the mountain Ananta.

References

Mountains of Peru
Mountains of Puno Region